is a  funicular railway station located in the city of Ōtsu, Shiga Prefecture, Japan, operated by the private railway company Hieizan Railway.

Lines
The train will stop only when it is notified in advance or when there is a call from the telephone installed at the station, and it usually passes.

Station layout
The station consists of a single side platform with no station building. Due to the not-so-steep slope of 160 ‰ in the vicinity, the platform is sloped rather than stepped.

Adjacent stations

History
Hōraioka Station was opened on April 2, 1984

Surrounding area
The station is located in dense forest with no road access, as the mountain paths to the station are usually blocked by called trees and debris. On alighting at this station, passengers have no choice but to return to the next train.

See also
List of railway stations in Japan

External links

Sakamoto Cable official home page

Railway stations in Shiga Prefecture
Railway stations in Japan opened in 1984
Railway stations in Ōtsu